Zahorski (feminine: Zahorska) may refer to:

People
 Andrzej Zahorski (1923–1995), Polish historian
 Anna Zahorska (1882–1942), Polish poet
 Tomasz Zahorski (born 1984), Polish footballer
 Stefania Zahorska (1890–1961), Polish art historian
 Tiffany Zahorski (born 1994), Russian ice dancer

Other
Zahorski theorem, a mathematical analysis theorem

See also